A blog rally is the simultaneous presentation of identical or similar material on numerous blogs, for the purpose of engaging large numbers of readers and/or persuading them to adopt a certain position or take a certain action. The simultaneous nature of a blog rally can join the efforts of otherwise independent bloggers for an agreed-upon purpose.  Blog Action Day can be likened to a blog rally.

The term was used by undergraduate student Karissa Kilgore at Seton Hill University in 2004 ("Since all of us in EL150 have blogging portfolios to do, and I realize that there is some pressure to have comments and whatnot, I suggest some sort of a blog rally to make sure we get decent feedback" from the instructor.), to describe a last-minute push by students to complete blogging homework for an English class.

An early instance of a planned blog rally outside of academe took place November 26 through November 30, 2008, in support of a viral movement called 'Engage with Grace: The One Slide Project' was organized to encourage families to discuss end-of-life care issues while gathered together for the Thanksgiving holiday weekend. As reported by one of the project organizers, over 95 bloggers participated in this event. This blog rally was repeated in 2009, 2010, 2011, and 2012.
	
Another blog rally occurred in April 2009, when a group of bloggers in the Boston area banded together in support of the Boston Globe, which was threatened with closure by its owner, The New York Times Company. Over two dozen bloggers simultaneously published a post asking readers to submit suggestions on ways the Globe could improve its financial position.  Later that month, another blog rally emerged in support of an imprisoned Iranian writer, Roxana Saberi.

Another blog rally occurred on June 22, 2009, when thought leaders across healthcare collaborated to launch HealthDataRights.org and unveiled a shared statement to ensure patients’ rights to access and share their own health information. A blog rally supported the introduction of the Declaration of Health Data Rights.

References

 Boston Globe on November 26, 2008
 Wall Street Journal's Health Blog on November 26, 2008
 Blue Mass Group Blog on April 6, 2009
 Boston Globe article on April 7, 2009
 "In Boston, paper's peril hits a nerve" New York Times April 12, 2009
 "Bloggers rally for health data rights" Boston Globe June 22, 2009

Blogging